The National Revolutionary Movement for Development (MRND) was the ruling political party of Rwanda from 1975 to 1994 under President Juvénal Habyarimana, running with first Vice President Edouard Karemera. From 1978 to 1991, the MRND was the only legal political party in the country. It was dominated by Hutus, particularly from President Habyarimana's home region of Northern Rwanda. The elite group of MRND party members who were known to have influence on the President and his wife are known as the akazu. In 1991, the party was renamed the National Republican Movement for Democracy and Development.

Following the Rwandan genocide in 1994, the party was banned.

History
The party was established by Habyarimana on 5 July 1975, exactly two years after he had ousted the first post-independence president Grégoire Kayibanda in a coup d'état. Habyarimana established a totalitarian state and banned the Parmehutu party, which had been dominated by Hutus from southern Rwanda. The MRND replaced Parmehutu as the sole legally permitted party in Rwanda. A new constitution was approved in a 1978 referendum. It codified the MRND's status as the only legal party, and declared that every Rwandan citizen was automatically a member of the MRND.

Presidential elections were held in 1978 with Habyarimana as the sole candidate. He was re-elected with 99% of the vote. Parliamentary elections followed in 1981, with two MRND candidates contesting each of the 64 seats. Habyarimana was re-elected again in 1983 and 1988, whilst parliamentary elections were held under the same system in 1983 (with the National Assembly enlarged to 70 seats) and 1988.

The party's name was changed after the legalisation of opposition parties in 1991. The youth wing of the party, the interahamwe, later developed into a militia group that played a key role in the Genocide against Tutsi. After Habyarimana's death in April 1994, hardline elements of the party were among the chief architects of the genocide; the Coalition for the Defence of the Republic (CDR), which played a significant role, was originally a hard-line faction of the MRND that became a separate party.

After Rwanda was conquered by the rival Tutsi-dominated Rwandan Patriotic Front led by Paul Kagame, both the MRND and the CDR were driven from power and banned in July 1994.

Ideology
Habyarimana was described as relatively moderate, though he (and his regime) are said to have used propaganda methods of the extreme right, ethnically discriminating against the Tutsi (albeit less extreme than their predecessors), advanced a conservative social agenda and were anti-communist.

Structure
Habyarimana was the president of the party, and as such was the only candidate for president of the republic. However, in a minor concession to democracy, voters were presented with two MRND candidates at Legislative Assembly elections.

Electoral history

Presidential elections

Chamber of Deputies elections

See also 
Parmehutu
Edouard Karemera
Coalition for the Defence of the Republic

References

Parties of one-party systems
MRND
Far-right politics in Africa
1975 establishments in Rwanda
Political parties established in 1975
1994 disestablishments in Rwanda
Political parties disestablished in 1994
Rwandan genocide
Banned far-right parties